Vilmos 'Willy' Radasics (born October 25, 1983 in Sopron) is a Hungarian Bicycle Motocross (BMX) racer. He took part in the UCI BMX World Championships 2008 in Taiyuan, China, represent his country.

Radasics competed for Hungary at the 2008 Summer Olympics in the Men's BMX event.

History Results

 8 times, National Champion, 3 times in elite category 
 6 times, the Sportsman of the Year 
 3 times, Austrian-Hungarian Champion

European Cup places:

 2000. 5th place
 2001. 3rd place
 2002. 5th place
 2003. 5th place

European Championship, finals:

 2000. 7th place
 2001. 3rd place, 4. place, 8. place
 2003. 7th place in elite category
 2006. 5th place in Sopron

World Championship:

 1993. The Netherlands 33rd place
 1999. France 17th place
 2001. USA 21st place
 2004. The Netherlands 33rd place
 2005. France 33rd place

References

External links
 
 
 
 
  
 

1983 births
Living people
BMX riders
Hungarian male cyclists
Olympic cyclists of Hungary
Cyclists at the 2008 Summer Olympics
People from Sopron
Sportspeople from Győr-Moson-Sopron County